Living with Joy is the fourth album from Yoko Takahashi.

Track listing

1996 albums
Yoko Takahashi albums